The National Society of Collegiate Scholars (NSCS) is a national non-profit academic honor society for college students in the United States. NSCS has active chapters at over 300 colleges and universities in the United States, including the District of Columbia and Puerto Rico.

Overview
As of Spring 2021, NSCS had over 300 registered and active on-campus chapters, including the national chapter and 1.4 million members, including 125,000 active members and 45,000 new members each year.

Prior to January 2020, membership was available to first- and second-year college students with GPAs of at least 3.4.  As of January 2020, the GPA requirement was reduced to 3.0. In either case, the GPA fulfills the requirement of being in the top 20% of their class.

The organization has been criticized for charging a membership fee for opportunities that are available for free, with one campus newspaper calling it a "scam".

Affiliations
NSCS is a 501(c)(3) non-profit organization accredited by the Association of College Honor Societies, and is tax-exempt.

The National Society of Collegiate Scholars is a member of several organizations, which include the Association of College Honor Societies, the certifying agency for college and university honor societies in the United States. Other organizations of which NSCS is a member include the following:
National Collegiate Honors Council (NCHC)
National Association of Student Personnel Administrators (NASPA)
National Scholarship Providers Association
American Association of Collegiate Registrars and Admissions Officers
American Association of Community Colleges
Association of American Colleges and Universities
National Academic Advising Association

Because NSCS is a member of the Association of College Honor Societies, student members qualify for a two-level pay grade increase with the U.S. Federal Government.

Finances
Notable figures from the organization's most recent (2018) Form 990 report to the IRS include:
 $4,777,294 received in membership dues
 $417,282 paid out in scholarships
 $1,543,128 paid out in salaries, including $290,069 to the CEO/founder
 $2,016,946 in office expenses

Fees
As of November, 2021, NSCS offers three tiers of membership.  Whichever level is chosen requires a one-time application fee; hence, an applicant can join at the Premium level and skip the Basic level.  There are presently no annual dues. Application fees are:
 Basic membership, $97
 Premium membership, $189
 Premium Plus membership, $389

Basic membership offers access to a scholarship pool of up to $750,000 in scholarships and awards annually, some of which goes directly to chapter funding.  There are 125,000 active members (students) who are eligible to apply for these funds.

Premium membership suggests "access to apply for an additional $100 million in scholarships via The Hub PLUS."  This is a funding source not under the control of NSCS, but rather, the Hub Foundation International, whose website explains that eligibility includes those engaging in "Islamic Studies and related fields." It provides funds for up to 15 students each year. The relationship between the two organizations is unclear. 

The third tier of membership, "Premium Plus" allows several personal coaching sessions, such as resume review, personal mentoring and a 'graduation package'.

History
NSCS was founded in 1994 at George Washington University in Washington, DC, by Steve Loflin, who, at the time, worked in Student Affairs at George Washington University. The first NSCS Convocation Induction was held on the George Washington University campus on April 30, 1994. Loflin founded NSCS to recognize students who performed well academically during their first years in college and to provide members with an opportunity to take a leadership role in the organization.

In 2017, NSCS partnered with Active Minds to help remove stigmas surrounding mental health. NSCS and Active minds emphasized that there is no correlation between GPA and mental health, and that high achievers should also not hesitate to seek mental counseling when necessary.

In 2020, NSCS entered a second major partnership with the Alzheimer's Association. This facilitated letter writing campaigns, virtual visits, and fundraising for the organization, conducted by dozens of chapters across the country.

In 2021, NSCS went through a rebranding, releasing a new logo and color scheme. At the same time, the organization launched new programs and services for members including a new portal to allow members from all campuses to interact online, access benefits, and find mentors.

Scholarships
NSCS offers both undergraduate and graduate scholarships totaling over $400,000 per year.

NSCS provides members with access to over $750,000 in scholarships and awards. Premium membership in NSCS "provides access to $100 million in scholarships via a related company, the Hub Foundation", but the amount distributed is not guaranteed to NSCS students, and the $100M appears to be an investment pool, a fraction of which is distributed, and for the fifteen people that may win scholarships, they are limited to specific fields of study.

References

External links
 
 National Society of Collegiate Scholars (Association of College Honor Societies)

Association of College Honor Societies
Student societies in the United States
Honor societies
Organizations established in 1994